April Dawn Heinrichs (born February 27, 1964) is an American former soccer player and coach. She was among the first players on the United States women's national soccer team, and was captain of the United States team which won the first ever FIFA Women's World Cup in 1991. She finished her international playing career with 46 caps and 35 goals. Heinrich coached the USA women's team from 2000 to 2004, under her tenure team USA finished third in 2003 FIFA Women's World Cup, won silver medal at Sydney 2000, and gold medal at Athens 2004 Olympics. In 1998 she became the first female player inducted into the National Soccer Hall of Fame. In January 2011, Heinrichs was appointed Technical Director for women's soccer by United States Soccer Federation.

Collegiate record
Heinrichs is a 1986 graduate of the UNC where she was named National Player of the Year twice and earned All-American First team honors three times.

Club career
After playing in the Mundialito with the United States national team, Heinrichs spent a short period playing professional soccer in the Italian Serie A with Juventus and then Prato.

Women's national team record
April Heinrichs played for United States women's national soccer team from 1986 through 1991, appeared in 46 matches and scored 35 goals, including fours goals at the 1991 FIFA Women's World Cup in China, where captain Heinrichs formed a forward line dubbed the "triple-edged sword" with Carin Jennings and Michelle Akers-Stahl. Heinrichs remains among the all-time leaders in goals scored for the USA.

Matches and goals scored at World Cup
April Heinrichs competed in the first FIFA Women's World Cup in 1991, and finished with her team as World Champions; played in five matches and scored four goals.

College head coach 
She had an 8–6–1 record as head coach at Princeton University in 1990.

Heinrichs guided University of Maryland to a 56–40–7 record from 1991 to 1995, earning Atlantic Coast Conference Coach of the Year honors in 1995 after leading the Terps to their first NCAA Tournament berth.

She was head coach from 1996 to 2000 at University of Virginia, where she recorded a 52–27–7 mark in leading the Cavaliers to four consecutive NCAA Tournament appearances. She led Virginia to a 13–10 record, including a trip to the round of 16 in the NCAA Tournament in 1999 season.

Coaching U.S. Women's National Team 
She joined the United States women's national soccer team as an assistant coach in 1995. She became the team's head coach in 2000.

During her tenure, Heinrichs was often criticized for failing to lead the previously unstoppable national squad to a major international championship, but she coached the team to victory at the 2004 Summer Olympics. Heinrichs led the United States to wins in international tournaments such as the Algarve Cup, Four Nations Cup, Gold Cup and a much celebrated return to the podium by winning Gold in Athens.  Heinrichs also led her team to the silver medal in the 2000 Summer Olympics and the bronze medal in the 2003 Women's World Cup.

Heinrichs' five years at the helm led to an 87–17–20 record.  She resigned as coach on February 15, 2005, and became a consultant for U.S. Soccer.

Olympic Committee 
She was named head coach for women's soccer at the University of California, Irvine, on December 19, 2005, and later resigned to accept a position with the U.S. Olympic Committee in Colorado Springs, Colorado.

Technical Director
In January 2011, April Heinrichs was hired by United States Soccer Federation as Technical Director for women's soccer. The appointment, along with Jill Ellis as development director, marks the first time U.S. Soccer had appointed full-time positions to oversee the women's youth national teams program. Besides focusing on technical directions of women's soccer, Heinrichs will oversee the under-20 and under-18 women's youth teams.

References

Match reports

External links 
National Soccer Hall of Fame biography
UCI Women's Soccer
Profile at SoccerTimes.com

1964 births
Living people
1991 FIFA Women's World Cup players
2003 FIFA Women's World Cup managers
American women's soccer coaches
FIFA Women's World Cup-winning captains
FIFA Women's World Cup-winning players
National Soccer Hall of Fame members
North Carolina Tar Heels women's soccer players
Serie A (women's football) players
United States women's international soccer players
United States women's national soccer team managers
William & Mary Tribe women's soccer coaches
American women's soccer players
Women's association football forwards
Virginia Cavaliers women's soccer coaches
Princeton Tigers women's soccer coaches
Maryland Terrapins women's soccer coaches
UC Irvine Anteaters women's soccer coaches
Female association football managers
American Olympic coaches
ASDF Juventus Torino players
Expatriate women's footballers in Italy
American expatriate sportspeople in Italy
A.C.F. Prato players